Anno (written: 庵野, 安野 or 阿武) or Annō (written: 案納) is a Japanese surname. Notable people with the surname include:

Anton Anno (1838-1893), German theatre actor, theatre director, and playwright
Hideaki Anno (庵野 秀明, born 1960), Japanese animation and video director
Masami Anno (案納 正美), Japanese animation producer and director
Mitsumasa Anno (安野 光雅, born 1926), Japanese writer and artist
Moyoco Anno (安野 モヨコ, born 1971), Japanese manga artist and wife of Hideaki Anno.
Noriko Anno (阿武 教子, born 1976), Japanese judoka

Japanese-language surnames